Rickie Solinger (born 1947)  is an independent historian, curator, and lecturer whose work focuses on reproductive politics, welfare politics, politics of incarceration, race and class, and motherhood.  She is the author of Wake Up Little Susie: Single Pregnancy and Race before Roe v. Wade, The Abortionist: A Woman Against the Law, Beggars and Choosers: How the Politics of Choice Shapes Adoption, Abortion, and Welfare in the U.S., Pregnancy and Power: A Short History of Reproductive Politics in America, Reproductive Politics: What Everyone Needs to Know, and, with co-author Loretta Ross, "Reproductive Justice: An Introduction," as well as articles about reproductive politics and welfare politics. Solinger curates art exhibitions associated with the themes of her books; the shows travel to college and university galleries around the country aiming to interrupt the curriculum.

Life and career 

She earned her Ph.D. in History from The Graduate Center of the City University of New York.

She is a founding member of Women United for Justice, Community, and Family, a Boulder, Colorado-based cross-class coalition of women committed to welfare justice. She has served on the Boulder County Welfare Review Committee and frequently speaks and writes in the community and elsewhere on matters of poverty, welfare, and economic justice.

Works

Books

Scholarly articles

Editor

Art installations 

Solinger creates art exhibitions associated with the theme of her books and installs them at college and university galleries. She uses art together with her scholarship to enrich opportunities for public education and interrupt the curriculum. She has produced art installations working with sculptors, photographers, and other activists since 1992. Her exhibitions have traveled to over 140 college and university galleries since 1992.

 "Wake Up Little Susie: Pregnancy and Power before Roe v. Wade"
 "Beggars and Choosers: Motherhood is Not a Class Privilege in America" - This exhibition, associated with the theme of Beggars and Choosers, made a visual claim for the legitimacy of all mothers and the importance of defending reproductive rights. The mothers in the photographs rejected or ignored the coercive politics of motherhood. This exhibition clarified the full meaning of reproductive rights: the right to decide to curb one's fertility as well as the right to decide to become a mother. It opened at the Birmingham Civil Rights Institute in 2002 and traveled to campuses up until late 2008.
 "Interrupted Life: Incarcerated Mothers in the United States" - This exhibition focuses on raising public knowledge—and public outrage and activism—about the incarceration system in this country. It is a collection of paintings, photographs, and installation pieces. It opened at the California Institution for Women in 2006 (the first time an outside art exhibition opened in a prison).
 "Reimagining the Distaff Toolkit" This exhibition features approximately thirty-five pieces of art. Each work of art features a tool that was important for women's domestic labor from the 18th century through World War II. The artists have placed objects such as a dressmaker’s figure, pots, pans, baskets, rolling pins, darning eggs and rug-beaters at the center of their works. According to Solinger, “Many of these old tools facilitated… repetitive labor and evoke the various cultural histories of women’s unpaid, often diminished and disrespected status within the household and society. But in the 21st century, at a moment when ‘old tools’ have become aestheticized and expensive, we can look again and see their costly beauty."

Awards 
In 1992 she won the first Lerner-Scott Award given by the Organization of American Historians for Wake Up Little Susie and in 2000 she received the Catherine Prelinger Award.

References

Footnotes

Sources

External links 
 Works by Rickie Solinger  in libraries (WorldCat)
 "Five myths about abortion" by Rickie Solinger in Washington Post Opinions, April 2013
 Women United for Justice, Community and Family - Solinger is a founding member

1947 births
Living people
20th-century American non-fiction writers
21st-century American non-fiction writers
21st-century American women writers
20th-century American women writers
American women non-fiction writers